Liparis habenarina, commonly known as the common sphinx orchid or common hobgoblin orchid, is a plant in the orchid family and is endemic to Australia. It is a deciduous, terrestrial orchid with two or three egg-shaped leaves and between eight and twenty-two brownish to purplish flowers with their lateral sepals joined at the base. It grows in the understorey of near-coastal forests.

Description
Liparis habenarina is a terrestrial, deciduous herb with two underground pseudobulbs, each of which lasts for one season. The labellum is egg-shaped with the narrower end towards the base and curves downwards. Flowering occurs between January and May.

Taxonomy and naming
The common sphinx orchid was first formally described in 1864 by Ferdinand von Mueller who gave it the name Sturmia habenarina and published the description in Fragmenta phytographiae Australiae. The description was based on a specimen collected near Rockingham Bay by John Dallachy. In the description, von Mueller noted Liparis habenarina as a synonym. In 1873, George Bentham changed the name to Liparis habenarina and published the name change in Flora Australiensis. The specific epithet (habenarina) refers to the similarity of this species to those in the orchid genus Habenaria.

Distribution and habitat
Liparis habenarina grows with grasses in the understorey of forests, usually near the edge of swamps in near-coastal areas. It is found in New South Wales north from Coffs Harbour, in coastal Queensland, the Northern Territory and the Northern Kimberley biogeographic region of Western Australia. Authorities using the name Empusa habenarina list the range as extending to New Guinea and Indonesia.

References 

habenarina
Orchids of Australia
Plants described in 1864
Taxa named by Ferdinand von Mueller